Twincest is incest between twins. 

Twincest may also refer to:

 Twincest, a 2004  performance art collaboration by Jiz Lee
 Twincest (Le Sexoflex), a 2010 film at the HUMP! festival